Hilton Village may refer to:

Hilton Village, a planned neighborhood in Newport News, Virginia
Hilton Village, Virginia, an unincorporated community in Pulaski County
Hilton Village, West Virginia, an unincorporated community in Fayette County

See also
Hilton Hawaiian Village
Hilton (disambiguation)